As of February 2023, 16 male players have played Test cricket for two nations, 16 have played One Day International (ODI) cricket for two teams, and 16 have played Twenty20 International (T20I) matches for two teams, and five have played for two teams in different international formats.

In the late-19th and early-20th centuries, players who had represented two international teams had been born in one country and moved to another with family. There were no clear rules on which nation one could represent, so switching was possible. More recently, citizenship has become the defining attribute as to whether a player can represent more than one international team. The eligibility policy set by the International Cricket Council (ICC) states that a cricketer who has played for a Full Member side must wait three years since their last match before playing for an Associate team. However, if a cricketer plays for an Associate team first, they can switch to a Full Member team the next day.

Billy Midwinter was the first cricketer to play for two nations during his career, playing two Test matches for Australia in 1877 before appearing for England in four Tests in 1881–82. Within a year he was representing Australia once again. The Bulletin noted that "In Australia he plays as an Englishman; in England, as an Australian; and he is always a credit to himself and his country ... whichever that may be."  Four other Test cricketers switched allegiance from Australia to England in the late-19th century: Billy Murdoch, J. J. Ferris, Sammy Woods and Albert Trott.  Both Frank Hearne and Frank Mitchell started their international careers playing for England but went on to play for the South African Test team. Three cricketers moved from representing India to Pakistan in the 1950s. John Traicos revived his Test career after playing for South Africa in 1970, albeit briefly, when he featured for Zimbabwe in four Test matches in the early 1990s, more than 22 years after his previous international Test appearance.

Kepler Wessels played both Test and ODI cricket for South Africa and Australia, while Guyana-born Clayton Lambert became the first cricketer to play just ODIs for two nations – after playing eleven matches for the West Indies between 1990 and 1998 (also five Tests), he played a single ODI for the United States in 2004. Barbados-born Anderson Cummins made 63 ODI appearances for the West Indies before playing 13 times for Canada after a twelve-year gap.  Gavin Hamilton played his only Test for one team (England) and his entire ODI and T20I career for another (Scotland) and Ryan Campbell played his entire ODI career solely for one team (Australia) and his entire T20I career solely for another team (Hong Kong). Gregory Strydom played ODIs for Zimbabwe in 2006 and T20Is for Cayman Islands in 2019. Both Dougie Brown and Ed Joyce began their international careers with England before switching teams, to Scotland and Ireland, while Eoin Morgan and Boyd Rankin made the opposite move, beginning with Ireland before switching to England. Luke Ronchi became the first player since Kepler Wessels to play for two Full Members of the International Cricket Council (ICC), making his ODI and T20I debuts for New Zealand in 2013 after having played for Australia in both formats five years earlier. 
Note: These lists include only those players who have played Test matches, ODIs or T20Is accredited by the International Cricket Council.

Key

Men's cricket

Test cricket

Sixteen players have represented two nations in Test cricket. List updated to 4 February 2023 (Test #2489).

One Day International cricket

Sixteen men have played international cricket for two ODI teams. List updated to 1 February 2023 (ODI #4514).

Twenty20 International cricket
Sixteen cricketers have represented two countries in T20I cricket. List updated to 23 December 2022 (T20I #1983).

Multiple formats
 Gavin Hamilton played one Test match for England in 1999, before playing 38 ODIs and 12 T20Is for Scotland.
Ryan Campbell played two ODI matches for Australia in 2002, and also played three T20I matches for Hong Kong in 2016.
Gregory Strydom played twelve ODIs for Zimbabwe in 2006 and six T20Is for Cayman Islands in 2019.
Andri Berenger played ODIs for UAE and T20Is for Qatar. He also played for Sri Lanka at under-19 level.
 Gary Ballance, in addition to playing Tests and ODIs for both England (2013 to 2017) and Zimbabwe (2023), played one T20I for Zimbabwe in 2023.

Women's cricket

Women's One Day International cricket
4 women have played One-day international cricket for two teams. List updated to 21 January 2023 (WODI #1311).

Women's Twenty20 International cricket
4 women have played Twenty20 international cricket for two teams. List updated to 26 February 2023 (WT20I #1378).

Multiple formats
Candacy Atkins played 1 WTest & 11 WODIs for West Indies (2003–2004) before playing 1 WT20I for USA in 2019.
Mahewish Khan played 2 WTests & 14 WODIs for Pakistan (1998–2001) and 3 WT20Is for Canada (2019).
Chamani Seneviratne, in addition to playing WT20Is for both Sri Lanka (1997–2013) and UAE (2018–present), played 1 WTest and 80 WODI for Sri Lanka (1997–2013).
Deepika Rasangika in addition to playing WT20IS for both Sri Lanka (2008–2014) and Bahrain (2022–present), played 31 WODIs for Sri Lanka (2008-2014).

References

Cricketers who have played for two international teams
Cricket